The Urnfield culture ( 1300 BC – 750 BC) was a late Bronze Age culture of Central Europe, often divided into several local cultures within a broader Urnfield tradition. The name comes from the custom of cremating the dead and placing their ashes in urns, which were then buried in fields. The first usage of the name occurred in publications over grave sites in southern Germany in the late 19th century. Over much of Europe, the Urnfield culture followed the Tumulus culture and was succeeded by the Hallstatt culture. Some linguists and archaeologists have associated this culture with the Proto-Celtic language, or a pre-Celtic language family.

Chronology

It is believed that in some areas, such as in southwestern Germany, the Urnfield culture was in existence around 1200 BC (beginning of Hallstatt A or Ha A), but the Bronze D Riegsee-phase already contains cremations. As the transition from the middle Bronze Age to the Urnfield culture was gradual, there are questions regarding how to define it.

The Urnfield culture covers the phases Hallstatt A and B (Ha A and B) in Paul Reinecke's chronological system, not to be confused with the Hallstatt culture (Ha C and D) of the following Iron Age. This corresponds to the Phases Montelius III-IV of the Northern Bronze Age. Whether Reinecke's Bronze D is included varies according to author and region.

The Urnfield culture is divided into the following sub-phases (based on Müller-Karpe sen.):

The existence of the Ha B3-phase is contested, as the material consists of female burials only. As can be seen by the arbitrary 100-year ranges, the dating of the phases is highly schematic. The phases are based on typological changes, which means that they do not have to be strictly contemporaneous across the whole distribution. All in all, more radiocarbon and dendro-dates would be highly desirable.

Origin
The Urnfield culture grew from the preceding Tumulus culture. The transition is gradual, in the pottery as well as the burial rites. In some parts of Germany, cremation and inhumation existed simultaneously (facies Wölfersheim). Some graves contain a combination of Tumulus-culture pottery and Urnfield swords (Kressbronn, Bodenseekreis) or Tumulus culture incised pottery together with early Urnfield types (Mengen). In the North, the Urnfield culture was only adopted in the HaA2 period.
16 pins deposited in a swamp in Ellmoosen (Kr. Bad Aibling, Germany) cover the whole chronological range from Bronze B to the early Urnfield period (Ha A). This demonstrates a considerable ritual continuity. In the Loire, Seine, and Rhône, certain fords contain deposits from the late Neolithic onward up to the Urnfield period.

The origins of the cremation rite are commonly believed to be in Hungary, where it was widespread since the first half of the second millennium BC. The neolithic Cucuteni–Trypillia culture of modern-day northeastern Romania and Ukraine were also practicing cremation rituals as early as approximately 5500 BC. Some cremations begin to be found in the Proto-Lusatian and Trzciniec culture.

Distribution and local groups

The Urnfield culture was located in an area stretching from western Hungary to eastern France, from the Alps to near the North Sea.
Local groups, mainly differentiated by pottery, include:

South-German Urnfield culture
 Northeast-Bavarian Group, divided into a lower Bavarian and an upper Palatinate group
 Lower-Main-Swabian group in southern Hesse and Baden-Württemberg, including the Marburger, Hanauer, lower Main and Friedberger facies
 Rhenish-Swiss group in Rhineland-Palatinate, Switzerland and eastern France, (abbreviated RSFO in French)
Lower-Rhine Urnfield culture
 Lower Hessian Group
 North-Netherlands-Westphalian group
 Northwest-Group in the Dutch Delta region

Middle-Danube Urnfield culture

 Velatice-Baierdorf in Moravia and Austria
 Čaka culture in western Slovakia
 Gáva culture
 Piliny culture
 Kyjatice culture
 Milavce culture in southeastern Bohemia
 Unstrut culture in Thuringia
 Virovitica in Slovenia and Croatia
 Lusatian culture in northern Bohemia, Lusatia and Poland

Sometimes the distribution of artifacts belonging to these groups shows sharp and consistent borders, which might indicate some political structures, like tribes. Metalwork is commonly of a much more widespread distribution than pottery and does not conform to these borders. It may have been produced at specialised workshops catering for the elite of a large area.

Important French cemeteries include Châtenay and Lingolsheim (Alsace). An unusual earthwork was constructed at Goloring near Koblenz in Germany.

Related cultures

The central European Lusatian culture forms part of the Urnfield tradition, but continues into the Iron Age without a notable break.

The Piliny culture in northern Hungary and Slovakia grew from the Tumulus culture, but used urn burials as well. The pottery shows strong links to the Gáva culture, but in the later phases, a strong influence of the Lusatian culture is found. In Italy the late Bronze Age Canegrate and Proto-Villanovan cultures and the early Iron Age Villanovan culture show similarities with the urnfields of central Europe. Urnfields are found in the French Languedoc and Catalonia from the 9th to 8th centuries. The change in burial custom was most probably influenced by developments further east.

The Golasecca culture in northern Italy developed with continuity from the Canegrate culture. Canegrate represented a completely new cultural dynamic to the area expressed in pottery and bronzework, making it a typical western example of the Urnfield culture, in particular the Rhine-Switzerland-Eastern France (RSFO) Urnfield culture. The Lepontic Celtic language inscriptions of the area show the language of the Golasecca culture was clearly Celtic making it probable that the 13th-century BC language of at least the RSEF area of the western urnfields was also Celtic or a precursor to it.

Placename evidence has also been used to point to an association of the Urnfield materials with a Proto-Celtic language group in central Europe, and it has been argued that it was the ancestral culture of the Celts.
The Urnfield layers of the Hallstatt culture, Ha A and Ha B, are succeeded by the Iron Age "Hallstatt period" proper (Ha C and Ha D, 8th-6th centuries BC), associated with the early Celts; Ha D is in turn succeeded by the La Tène culture, the archaeological culture associated with the Continental Celts of antiquity.

The influence of the Urnfield culture spread widely and found its way to the northeastern Iberian coast, where the nearby Celtiberians of the interior adapted it for use in their cemeteries. Evidence for east-to-west early Urnfield (Bronze D-Hallstatt A) elite contacts such as rilled-ware, swords and crested helmets has been found in the southwest of the Iberian peninsula. The appearance of such elite status markers provides the simplest explanation for the spread of Celtic languages in this area from prestigious, proto-Celtic, early-Urnfield metalworkers.

Migrations

The numerous hoards of the Urnfield culture and the existence of fortified settlements (hill forts) were taken as evidence for widespread warfare and upheaval by some scholars.
Written sources describe several collapses and upheavals in the Eastern Mediterranean, Anatolia and the Levant around the time of the Urnfield origins:

 End of the Mycenean culture with a conventional date of  1200 BC
 Destruction of Troy VI  1200 BC
 Battles of Ramses III against the Sea Peoples, 1195–1190 BC
 End of the Hittite empire 1180 BC
 Settlement of the Philistines in Canaan  1170 BC

Some scholars, among them Wolfgang Kimmig and P. Bosch-Gimpera have postulated a Europe-wide wave of migrations. The so-called Dorian invasion of Greece was placed in this context as well (although more recent evidence suggests that the Dorians moved in 1100 BC into a post Mycenaean vacuum, rather than precipitating the collapse). Better methods of dating have shown that these events are not as closely connected as once thought.

More recently Robert Drews, after having reviewed and dismissed the migration hypothesis, has suggested that the observed cultural associations may be in fact partly explained as the result of a new kind of warfare based upon the slashing Naue II sword, and with bands of infantry replacing chariots in warfare. Drews suggests that the political instability that this brought to centralised states based upon maryannu chariotry caused the breakdown of these polities.

Ethnicity

The variety of regional groups belonging to this culture makes it possible to exclude the presence of ethnic uniformity. Marija Gimbutas connected the various Central European regional groups to as many proto-populations: proto-Celts, proto-Italics, proto-Veneti, proto-Illyrians and proto-Phrygians (as well as proto-Thracians and proto-Dorians), who would establish themselves later, through migrations, in their historic locations. This migration (disputed by some) occurred during the period called late Bronze Age collapse and was perhaps caused by climate changes. Communities of peasants and herders, led by a warrior aristocracy, introduced the new rite of cremation, new ceramic styles and the mass production of metal objects as well as a new religion and Indo-European languages in various regions of Western and Southern Europe.

Settlements

The number of settlements increased sharply in comparison with the preceding Tumulus culture. Few of them have been comprehensively excavated. Fortified settlements, often on hilltops or in river-bends, are typical for the Urnfield culture. They are heavily fortified with dry-stone or wooden ramparts. Excavations of open settlements are rare, but they show that large 3-4 aisled houses built with wooden posts and wall of wattle and daub were common. Pit dwellings are known as well; they might have served as cellars.

Fortified settlements

Fortified hilltop settlements become common in the Urnfield period. Often a steep spur was used, where only part of the circumference had to be fortified. Depending on the locally available materials, dry-stone walls, gridded timbers filled with stones or soil or plank and palisade type pfostenschlitzmauer fortifications were used. Other fortified settlements used river-bends and swampy areas.

Metal working is concentrated in the fortified settlements. On the Runder Berg near Urach, Germany, 25 stone moulds have been found.

Hillforts are interpreted as central places. Some scholars see the emergence of hill forts as a sign of increased warfare. Most hillforts were abandoned at the end of the Bronze Age.

Examples of fortified settlements include Bullenheimer Berg, Ehrenbürg, Hünenburg bei Watenstedt, Heunischenburg, Hesselberg, Bürgstadter Berg, Farrenberg and Ipf in Germany, Burgstallkogel, Thunau am Kamp and Oberleiserberg in Austria, Corent and Gannat in France, Hořovice and Plešivec in the Czech Republic, Biskupin in Poland, Ormož in Slovenia, Corneşti-Iarcuri, Sântana and Teleac in Romania, Gradište Idoš in Serbia, and Velem and Csanádpalota–Földvár in Hungary.

The 30.5 ha plateau of the Bullenheimer Berg in Germany was the site of a "large, walled, city-like" settlement in the later Urnfield period. Excavations have revealed a dense settlement across the whole plateau, including courtyard-type buildings located on artificially raised terraces. The fortified settlement on the Ehrenbürg, also covering about 30 ha and surrounded by a pfostenschlitzmauer-type wall, was another regional centre during the Urnfield period and the residence of a regional elite. At the hill fort of Hořovice near Beroun (Czech Republic), 50 ha were surrounded by a stone wall. Most settlements were much smaller.

Corneşti-Iarcuri in Romania was the largest prehistoric settlement in Europe, at almost 6 km across, with four fortification lines and an inner settlement with a diameter of c. 2 km. Magnetic mapping and excavations have suggested the existence of a dense, well-organised settlement of urban character during the Urnfield period. An estimated 824,00 tonnes of earth had to be moved for the construction of the fortification walls alone.

"Mega forts" such as Corneşti-Iarcuri (and Gradište Idoš in Serbia) were surrounded by numerous smaller settlements, including fortified sites. They formed part of a general movement towards large fortified sites across Europe in the Late Bronze Age, possibly in response to new styles of warfare. The general uniformity in design, material culture, and the density of settlements in Romania and Serbia at this time is "indicative of one or more multilocal societies which must have been organized under a common political framework." Kristiansen and Suchowska-Ducke (2015) describe these mega-sites as "part of a political centralisation process, a complex chiefdom, or archaic state".

Open settlements

Urnfield period houses were one or two-aisled. Some were quite small, 4.5 m × 5 m at the Runder Berg (Urach, Germany), 5-8m long in Künzig (Bavaria, Germany), others up to 20 m long. They were built with wooden posts and walls of wattle and daub. At the Velatice-settlement of Lovčičky (Moravia, Czech Republic) 44 houses have been excavated. Large bell shaped storage pits are known from the Knovíz-culture. The settlement of Radonice (Louny) contained over 100 pits. They were most probably used to store grain and demonstrate a considerable surplus-production.

Pile dwellings

On lakes of southern Germany and Switzerland, numerous pile dwellings were constructed. They consist either of simple houses made of wattle and daub, or log-built. The settlement at Zug, Switzerland, was destroyed by fire and gives important insights into the material culture and the settlement organisation of this period. It has yielded a number of dendro-dates as well.

Material culture

Pottery

The pottery is normally well made, with a smooth surface and a normally sharply carinated profile. Some forms are thought to imitate metal prototypes. Biconical pots with cylindrical necks are especially characteristic. There is some incised decoration, but a large part of the surface was normally left plain. Fluted decoration is common. In the Swiss pile dwellings, the incised decoration was sometimes inlaid with tin foil.
Pottery kilns were already known (Elchinger Kreuz, Bavaria), as is indicated by the homogeneous surface of the vessels as well.
Other vessels include cups of beaten sheet-bronze with riveted handles (type Jenišovice) and large cauldrons with cross attachments. Wooden vessels have only been preserved in waterlogged contexts, for example from Auvernier (Neuchâtel), but may have been quite widespread.

Tools and weapons

The early Urnfield period (1300 BC) was a time when the warriors of central Europe could be heavily armored with body armor, helmets and shields all made of bronze, most likely borrowing the idea from Mycenaean Greece.

The leaf-shaped Urnfield sword could be used for slashing, in contrast to the stabbing-swords of the preceding Tumulus culture. It commonly possessed a ricasso. The hilt was normally made from bronze as well. It was cast separately and consisted of a different alloy. These solid hilted swords were known since Bronze D (Rixheim swords). Other swords have tanged blades and probably had a wood, bone, or antler hilt. Flange-hilted swords had organic inlays in the hilt. Swords include Auvernier, Kressborn-Hemigkofen, Erbenheim, Möhringen, Weltenburg, Hemigkofen and Tachlovice-types.

Protective gear like shields, cuirasses, greaves and helmets are rare and almost never found in burials. The best-known example of a bronze shield comes from Plzeň in Bohemia and has a riveted handhold. Comparable pieces have been found in Germany, Western Poland, Denmark, Great Britain and Ireland. They are supposed to have been made in upper Italy or the Eastern Alps and imitate wooden shields. Irish bogs have yielded examples of leather shields (Clonbrinn, Co. Wexford). Bronze cuirasses are known since Bronze D (Čaka, grave II, Slovakia).

Complete bronze cuirasses have been found in Saint Germain du Plain, nine examples, one inside the other, in Marmesse, Haute Marne (France), fragments in Albstadt-Pfeffingen (Germany). Bronze dishes (phalerae) may have been sewn on a leather armour. Greaves of richly decorated sheet-bronze are known from Kloštar Ivanić (Croatia) and the Paulus cave near Beuron (Germany).

Chariots

About a dozen wagon-burials of four wheeled wagons with bronze fittings are known from the early Urnfield period. They include Hart an der Altz (Kr. Altötting), Mengen (Kr. Sigmaringen), Poing (Kr. Ebersberg), Königsbronn (Kr. Heidenheim) from Germany and St. Sulpice (Vaud), Switzerland. In Alz, the chariot had been placed on the pyre, pieces of bone are attached to the partially melted metal of the axles. Bronze (one-part) bits appear at the same time. Two-part horse bits are only known from late Urnfield contexts and may be due to eastern influence. Wood- and bronze spoked wheels are known from Stade (Germany), a wooden spoked wheel from Mercurago, Italy. Wooden dish-wheels have been excavated at Courcelettes, Switzerland and the Wasserburg Buchau, Germany (diameter 80 cm). In Milavče near Domažlice, Bohemia, a four-wheeled miniature bronze wagon bearing a large cauldron (diameter 30 cm) contained a cremation. This exceptionally rich burial was covered by a barrow. The wagon from Acholshausen (Bavaria) comes from a male burial.

Such wagons are known from the Nordic Bronze Age as well. The Skallerup wagon, Denmark, contained a cremation as well. At Peckatel (Kr. Schwerin) in Mecklenburg a cauldron-wagon and other rich grave goods accompanied an inhumation under a barrow (Montelius III/IV). Another example comes from Ystad in Sweden. South-eastern European examples include Kanya in Hungary and Orăştie in Romania. Clay miniature wagons, sometimes with waterfowl were known there since the middle Bronze Age (Dupljaja, Vojvodina, Serbia).

The Lusatian chariot from Burg (Brandenburg, Germany) has three wheels on a single axle, on which waterfowl perch. The grave of Gammertingen (Kr. Sigmaringen, Germany) contained two socketed horned applications that probably belonged to a miniature wagon comparable to the Burg example, together with six miniature spoked wheels.

Bronze spoked wheels from Hassloch and Stade (in Germany) have been described as "the most ambitious craft endeavour of all Bronze Age bronze objects", representing "the highest achievement of prehistoric bronze casters in non-Greek Europe ... In terms of casting technique, they are on a par with the casting of a Greek bronze statue."

Hoards
Hoards are very common in the Urnfield culture. The custom is abandoned at the end of the Bronze Age. They were often deposited in rivers and wet places like swamps. As these spots were often quite inaccessible, they most probably represent gifts to the gods. Other hoards contain either broken or miscast objects that were probably intended for reuse by bronze smiths. As Late Urnfield hoards often contain the same range of objects as earlier graves, some scholars interpret hoarding as a way to supply personal equipment for the hereafter. In the river Trieux, Côtes du Nord, complete swords were found together with numerous antlers of red deer that may have had a religious significance as well.

Gallery

Iron
An iron knife or sickle from Ganovce in Slovakia, possibly dating from the 18th century BC, may be the earliest evidence of smelted iron in Central Europe. Other early finds include an iron ring from Vorwohlde (Germany) dating from c. the 15th century BC (Reinecke B), and an iron chisel from Heegermühle (Germany) dating from c. 1000 BC. During the late Bronze Age, Iron was used to decorate the hilts of swords (Schwäbisch-Hall-Gailenkirchen, Unterkrumbach, Kr. Hersbruck), knives (Dotternhausen, Plettenberg, Germany), pins and some other ornaments. The Carpathian Basin was an early centre of iron technology, with iron artefacts dating from the 10th century BC, and possibly as early as the 12th century BC. Regular use of iron for weapons and tools in Central Europe began with the Hallstatt culture.

Economy

Cattle, pigs, sheep and goats were kept, as well as horses, dogs and geese. The cattle were rather small, with a height of 1.20 m at the withers. Horses were not much bigger with a mean of 1.25 m.

Forest clearance was intensive in the Urnfield period. Probably open meadows were created for the first time, as shown by pollen analysis. This led to increased erosion and sediment-load of the rivers. New crops and more intensive agrarian regimes are introduced, transforming landscapes on a large scale.

Wheat and barley were cultivated, together with pulses and the horse bean. Poppy seeds were used for oil or as a drug. Millet and oats were cultivated for the first time in Hungary and Bohemia, rye was already cultivated, further west it was only a noxious weed. Flax seems to have been of reduced importance, maybe because mainly wool was used for clothes.
Hazel nuts, apples, pears, sloes and acorns were collected. Some rich graves contain bronze sieves that have been interpreted as wine-sieves (Hart an der Alz). This beverage would have been imported from the South, but supporting evidence is lacking.
In the lacustrine settlement of Zug, remains of a broth made of spelt and millet have been found. In the lower-Rhine urnfields, leavened bread was often placed on the pyre and burnt fragments have thus been preserved.

Wool was spun (finds of spindle whorls are common) and woven on the warp-weighted loom; bronze needles (Unteruhldingen) were used for sewing.

There is some suggestion that the Urnfield culture is associated with a wetter climatic period than the earlier Tumulus cultures. This may be associated with the diversion of the mid-latitude winter storms north of the Pyrenees and the Alps, possibly associated with drier conditions in the Mediterranean basin.

Numerals

Large hoards of sickles dating from the Bronze Age have been excavated across central Europe which feature a range of cast markings. An analysis of the Frankleben hoard and other sickle hoards from Germany dating from the Urnfield period found that markings on the sickles constitute a numeral system related to the lunar calendar. According to the Halle State Museum of Prehistory:

The sickles also feature other marks or symbols which Sommmerfeld (1994) suggests may represent 'conceptual signs', or a type of proto-writing. Markings on sickles and tools from across Bronze Age Europe have been interpreted by other authors as ownership marks, sign systems, number systems or "units of information" of unknown meaning.

'Counting marks' have also been identified on bronze armrings and ingots from the Urnfield period, possibly related to trade. Similar markings found on pottery have been interpreted as serving a calendar function.

Golden hats

Four elaborate cone-shaped hats made from thin sheets of gold have been found in Germany and France, dated to 1400-800 BC. It is thought that they may have been worn as ceremonial hats by "king-priests" or oracles.

The gold hats are covered in bands of ornaments along their whole length and extent. The ornaments – mostly disks and concentric circles, sometimes wheels, crescents, pointed oval shapes and triangles – were punched using stamps, rolls or combs. An analysis of the Berlin Gold Hat found that its ornaments form systematic patterns, representing the Metonic cycle of a lunisolar calendar. According to Wilfried Menghin: “The symbols on the hat are a logarithmic table which enables the movements of the sun and the moon to be calculated in advance.” Similar ornaments are found on the gold bowls of the Eberswalde hoard, some of which also contain calendrical information. Astronomical and calendrical interpretations have also been proposed for gold items from the Bullenheimer Berg in Germany, the gold diadem and roundels from Velem in Hungary, gold appliqués from Lake Bled in Slovenia, gold discs from the Czech Republic, the Trundholm sun chariot from Denmark, bronze discs from Germany and Denmark, and bronze urns from Germany (including Seddin and Gevelinghausen), Denmark and Poland. The conical gold hats have been linked to the Casco de Leiro from Spain and the Comerford Crown from Ireland, which also bear similar symbols.

In his analysis of the Velem diadem, archaeologist Gabor Ilon writes: "high-ranking members of the elite in Bronze Age Europe were proud owners of gold foil-covered costume adornments and symbols of status and power as well as of golden vessels, objects of social display, decorated with an identical set of symbols ... embodying what was presumably an identical and coherent spiritual background." According to the Musée d'Archaeologie Nationale, "these precious and remarkably executed objects evoke a complex society, undoubtedly strictly hierarchical, with advanced technical and astronomical knowledge, organized around work in the fields".

Funerary customs

Graves

In the Tumulus period, multiple inhumations under barrows were common, at least for the upper levels of society. In the Urnfield period, inhumation and burial in single flat graves prevails, though some barrows exist.

In the earliest phases of the Urnfield period, man-shaped graves were dug, sometimes provided with a stone lined floor, in which the cremated remains of the deceased were spread. Only later, burial in urns became prevalent. Some scholars speculate that this may have marked a fundamental shift in people's beliefs or myths about life and the afterlife.

The size of the urnfields is variable. In Bavaria, they can contain hundreds of burials, while the largest cemetery in Baden-Württemberg in Dautmergen has only 30 graves.
The dead were placed on pyres, covered in their personal jewellery, which often shows traces of the fire and sometimes food-offerings. The cremated bone-remains are much larger than in the Roman period, which indicates that less wood was used. Often, the bones have been incompletely collected.
Most urnfields are abandoned with the end of the Bronze Age, only the Lower Rhine urnfields continue in use in the early Iron Age (Ha C, sometimes even D).

The cremated bones could be placed in simple pits. Sometimes the dense concentration of the bones indicates a container of organic material, sometimes the bones were simply shattered.

If the bones were placed in urns, these were often covered by a shallow bowl or a stone. In a special type of burial (bell-graves) the urns are completely covered by an inverted larger vessel. As graves rarely overlap, they may have been marked by wooden posts or stones.
Stone-pacing graves are typical of the Unstrut group.

Grave gifts

The urn containing the cremated bones is often accompanied by other, smaller ceramic vessels, like bowls and cups. They may have contained food. The urn is often placed in the centre of the assemblage. Often, these vessels have not been placed on the pyre. Metal grave gifts include razors, weapons that often have been deliberately destroyed (bent or broken), bracelets, pendants and pins. Metal grave gifts become rarer towards the end of the Urnfield culture, while the number of hoards increase.
Burnt animal bones are often found, they may have been placed on the pyre as food. The marten bones in the grave of Seddin may have belonged to a garment (pelt).
Amber or glass beads (Pfahlbautönnchen) are luxury items.

Upper-class graves

Upper-class burials were placed in wooden chambers, rarely stone cists or chambers with a stone-paved floor and covered with a barrow or cairn. The graves contain especially finely made pottery, animal bones, usually of pigs, sometimes gold rings or sheets, and in exceptional cases miniature wagons.
Some of these rich burials contain the remains of more than one person. In this case, women and children are normally seen as sacrifices. Until more is known about the status distribution and the social structure of the late Bronze Age, this interpretation should be viewed with caution, however.
Towards the end of the Urnfield period, some bodies were burnt in situ and then covered by a barrow, reminiscent of the burial of Patroclus as described by Homer and the burial of Beowulf (with the additional ship burial element). The grave of Seddin (c. 9th century BC) has been described as a "Homeric burial" due to its close similarity to contemporary elite burials in Greece and Italy. In the early Iron Age, inhumation became the rule again.

Cult
An obsession with waterbirds is indicated by numerous pictures and three-dimensional representations. Combined with the hoards deposited in rivers and swamps, it indicates religious beliefs connected with water. This has led some scholars to believe in serious droughts during the late Bronze Age.
Sometimes the water-birds are combined with circles, the so-called sun-barque or solar boat motif. Moon-shaped clay fire dogs are thought to have a religious significance, as well as crescent shaped razors.

The Kyffhäuser caves in Thuringia contain headless skeletons and animal bones that have been interpreted as sacrifices. Other deposits include grain, knotted vegetable fibres and hair and bronze objects (axes, pendants and pins). The Ith-caves (Lower Saxony) have yielded comparative material.

Genetics

A genetic study published in Nature in March 2015 examined the remains of an Urnfield male buried in Halberstadt, Germany ca 1100-1000 BC. He was found to be a carrier of the paternal haplogroup R1a1a1b1a2 and the maternal haplogroup H23.

A genetic study published in Science in March 2019 found a significant increase in north-central European ancestry in Iberia during the transition from the Bronze Age to the Iron Age. The authors of the study suggested that the spread of the Urnfield culture was associated with this transition, during which the Celtiberians may have emerged. A Celtiberian male examined in the study was found to be a carrier of the paternal haplogroup I2a1a1a.

A genetic study published in Science in November 2019 examined the remains of a female from the Proto-Villanovan culture buried in Martinsicuro, Italy between c. 900 BC and 800 BC. She carried the maternal haplogroup U5a2b.

See also
 Prehistoric Europe
 Bronze Age Europe
 Beaker culture
 Nordic Bronze Age
 Tumulus culture
 Hallstatt culture
 Lusatian culture
 Solar deity
 Sorothaptic language

References

External links

 The First ‘Urnfields’ in the Plains of the Danube and the Po (Cavazzuti et al. 2022)
 Bronze age fortresses in Europe
 From Dupljaja to Delphi: the ceremonial use of the wagon in later prehistory
 The Cult-Wagon of Liptovský Hrádok: First evidence of using the Urnfield cult-wagons as fat-powered lamps

Bibliography

 
 J. M. Coles/A. F. Harding, The Bronze Age in Europe (London 1979).
 G. Weber, Händler, Kieger, Bronzegießer (Kassel 1992).
 Ute Seidel, Bronzezeit. Württembergisches Landesmuseum Stuttgart (Stuttgart 1995).
 Konrad Jażdżewski, Urgeschichte Mitteleuropas (Wrocław 1984)
 Association Abbaye de Daoulas (eds.), Avant les Celtes. L'Europe a l'age du Bronze (Daoulas 1988).
 
 
 Frans Theuws, Nico Roymans (eds.), Land and ancestors: cultural dynamics in the Urnfield period and the Middle Ages in the southern Netherlands, Amsterdam Archaeological Studies, Amsterdam University Press, 1999, .

 
Bronze Age cultures of Europe
Archaeological cultures of Central Europe
Archaeological cultures of Southern Europe
Archaeological cultures of Southeastern Europe
Archaeological cultures of Southwestern Europe
Archaeological cultures of Western Europe
Celtic archaeological cultures
Archaeological cultures in Austria
Archaeological cultures in Belgium
Archaeological cultures in Croatia
Archaeological cultures in the Czech Republic
Archaeological cultures in France
Archaeological cultures in Germany
Archaeological cultures in Hungary
Archaeological cultures in Italy
Archaeological cultures in the Netherlands
Archaeological cultures in Poland
Archaeological cultures in Romania
Archaeological cultures in Slovakia
Archaeological cultures in Slovenia
Archaeological cultures in Spain
Archaeological cultures in Switzerland
Archaeological cultures in Ukraine
13th-century BC establishments
2nd-millennium BC establishments
8th-century BC disestablishments
Italo-Celtic